Heidenheim is a Landkreis (district) in the east of Baden-Württemberg, Germany. Neighboring districts are (from north clockwise) Ostalbkreis, Dillingen, Günzburg, Alb-Donau and Göppingen.

History
The district dates back to the Oberamt Heidenheim, which was created at the beginning of the 19th century. In 1808 it was enlarged by merging with the Oberamt Giengen. It was converted into a district in 1934/38, and enlarged by municipalities from the Oberamt Neresheim and the Oberamt Ulm. The communal reform of 1973 left the district virtually unchanged.

Geography
The district is located in the high plains of the Swabian Alb (Schwäbische Alb) mountains.

Coat of arms
The coat of arms show the colors of the Lords of Hellenstein in the left half. They ruled the city Heidenheim until 1307. The castle tower to the right symbolizes the many castles in the district. The area was split between many ruling families, who built castles for protecting their ownership.

Cities and municipalities

Former cities and villages

References

External links

Official website (German)

 
Stuttgart (region)
Districts of Baden-Württemberg